The Western Canadian Championship is a Gaelic football championship tournament of the Western Divisional Board of the Gaelic Athletic Association, played every year in British Columbia and Alberta, Canada. The championship includes Men's and Ladies' Gaelic football, two of the sports which make up Gaelic games.

History
In 2004, the first formal GAA sanctioned Western Canadian Championships were played. The Divisional Board, in order to facilitate tournaments that include unaffiliated teams (i.e. not in the Western Divisional Board), and to allow each teams host critical games (understanding the travel distances between venues), agreed that the Championship would be played out in a League format. Each member team would play each other team twice, over two tournaments. The venue for Championship games would be rotated so that each team is required to cross the Rockies only once each year. Only the 5 member clubs (5 men's & 3 ladies' teams) compete in this Championship.

The Fraser Valley Gaels won the 2016 championship.

Roll of honour

By year

References

 
Gaelic football competitions in Canada
Sport in Vancouver
Gaelic games in Western Canada